The Otago Charity Classic was a golf tournament held in New Zealand from 1970 to 1978. The event was hosted by St Clair Golf Club in Dunedin.

History 
The event was part of the PGA of New Zealand circuit. John Lister won the event in successive years, 1973 and 1974. Kel Nagle also won the tournament twice, in 1970 and 1976. Gaylord Burrows won A$9,200 for a hole-in-one in the final event in 1978.

Winners

1 Underwood won with a par of the first extra hole
2 Miller won with a birdie at the first extra hole

References

Golf tournaments in New Zealand
Recurring sporting events established in 1970
Recurring events disestablished in 1978
1970 establishments in New Zealand
1978 disestablishments in New Zealand
Sport in Dunedin